The £1,000,000 Bank Note and Other New Stories is an 1893 collection of short stories by American writer Mark Twain.

Background
The collection was published in 1893, in a disastrous decade for the United States, a time marked by doubt and waning optimism, rapid immigration, labor problems, and the rise of political violence and social protest.

It was also a difficult time for Twain personally, as he was forced into bankruptcy and devastated by the death of his favorite daughter, Suzy. Yet the title story still brims with confidence and optimism, marking the moment of hope just before Twain turned to the grim stories of his later years.

Notes

External links
 
 The £1,000,000 Bank Note public domain book at Project Gutenberg

1893 short story collections
Short story collections by Mark Twain
Novels set in London
Chatto & Windus books